Malung is an unincorporated community in Roseau County, in the U.S. state of Minnesota.

History
A post office called Malung was established in 1895, and remained in operation until 1954. The community was named after Malung, in Sweden.

References

Unincorporated communities in Roseau County, Minnesota
Unincorporated communities in Minnesota